Mount Nightingale can mean

 Mount Nightingale (Turkey), location of House of the Virgin Mary, Turkey
 Mount Nightingale (British Columbia), Canada, named after Florence Nightingale

See also
 Nightingale (disambiguation)